Marafa is a settlement in Kenya's Kilifi County. Best known for the Marafa Depression, a vast canyon-like area resulting from soil erosion.

A picture

Kilifi County